Perinetto da Benevento or Perrinetto di Maffeo da Benevento (active mid-15th century) was an Italian painter, active in Naples.

Biography
Almost no biographical details are known about this painter who collaborated with Leonardo da Besozzo in frescoing the chapel of Sergianni Caracciolo in San Giovanni a Carbonara in Naples. He was active between 1450 and 1465.

References

15th-century births
15th-century deaths
15th-century Italian painters
Italian male painters
Painters from Naples